Gabriel Goldney may refer to:

Sir Gabriel Goldney, 1st Baronet (1813–1900), member of the House of Commons from 1865 to 1885
Sir Gabriel Goldney, 2nd Baronet (1843–1925), barrister, son of the above

See also
Goldney (surname)